The African Youth Championship 1987 was contested through home and away matches. It also served as qualification for the 1987 FIFA World Youth Championship.

Teams
The following teams entered the tournament (and played at least one match):

Preliminary round
Swaziland, Lesotho, Sudan, Gabon, Gambia and Maurituania all withdrew: Mauritius, Mozambique, Egypt, Ghana, Togo and Algeria advanced to the first round.

1 Angola were ejected from the competition for fielding overaged players in the first leg.

First round

1 Zimbabwe were ejected from the competition for using ineligible players. 
2 Ethopia withdrew after the first leg. 
3 Ghana were ejected from the competition for using ineligible players. 
4 Mauritius withdrew.

Quarterfinals
Mozambique withdrew, meaning Somalia advanced to the Semi-Finals.

Semifinals

Final

Qualification to World Youth Championship
The two best performing teams qualified for the 1987 FIFA World Youth Championship.

External links
Results by RSSSF

Africa U-20 Cup of Nations
Youth
1987 in youth association football